Strophidia caudata is a moth of the family Uraniidae first described by Johan Christian Fabricius in 1781. It is found in the Indian subregion, Sri Lanka, to Peninsular Malaysia, Borneo and Sulawesi.

It is a whitish moth with darker fasciations. The fasciae are numerous subbasally on the forewing. Series of black dots found on tail of hindwings.

References

Moths of Asia
Moths described in 1781
Uraniidae